Ramón Pileta (born March 20, 1977) is a Honduran judoka. He competed at the 2016 Summer Olympics in the men's +100 kg event, in which he was eliminated in the first round by Rafael Silva.

References

External links
 

1977 births
Living people
Honduran male judoka
Olympic judoka of Honduras
Judoka at the 2016 Summer Olympics
Judoka at the 2015 Pan American Games
Pan American Games competitors for Honduras